Daviesia quadrilatera, commonly known as buggery bush, is a species of flowering plant in the family Fabaceae and is endemic to the south-west of Western Australia. It is a robust, erect, glabrous shrub with angular branchlets, vertically flattened, sharply-pointed quadrilateral or triangular phyllodes with a sharp point on the end, and yellow to orange and red flowers.

Description

Taxonomy and naming
Daviesia quadrilatera was first formally described in 1839 by John Lindley in A Sketch of the Vegetation of the Swan River Colony from an unpublished description by George Bentham. The specific epithet (quadrilatera) means "four-sided", referring to the shape of the phyllodes.

Distribution and habitat
This daviesia grows in kwongan between New Norcia and Dongara, and is common in the area between Green Head, Coorow and Three Springs, in the Avon Wheatbelt and Geraldton Sandplains biogeographic regions of south-western Western Australia.

Conservation status
Daviesia quadrilatera is listed as "not threatened" by the Western Australian Government Department of Biodiversity, Conservation and Attractions.

References

quadrilatera
Eudicots of Western Australia
Plants described in 1839
Taxa named by John Lindley